Paul Mathies (born 12 January 1911, date of death unknown) was a German international footballer.

References

1911 births
Year of death missing
Association football midfielders
German footballers
Germany international footballers